Odah Marshall (born 14 April 1992) is a Nigerian footballer who plays as a forward.

References

External links

1992 births
Living people
Nigerian footballers
Association football forwards
Rangers International F.C. players
Song Lam Nghe An FC players
Yadanarbon F.C. players
Rivers United F.C. players
ENPPI SC players
Ismaily SC players
Hapoel Hadera F.C. players
Boluspor footballers
Bnei Sakhnin F.C. players
Hapoel Umm al-Fahm F.C. players
Hapoel Kfar Saba F.C. players
Nigeria Professional Football League players
V.League 1 players
Myanmar National League players
Oman Professional League players
Egyptian Premier League players
Israeli Premier League players
TFF First League players
Nigerian expatriate footballers
Expatriate footballers in Vietnam
Expatriate footballers in Myanmar
Expatriate footballers in Oman
Expatriate footballers in Egypt
Expatriate footballers in Israel
Expatriate footballers in Turkey
Nigerian expatriate sportspeople in Vietnam
Nigerian expatriate sportspeople in Myanmar
Nigerian expatriate sportspeople in Oman
Nigerian expatriate sportspeople in Egypt
Nigerian expatriate sportspeople in Israel
Nigerian expatriate sportspeople in Turkey